Glucosidase, beta; acid, pseudogene, also known as GBAP, is a human gene.

References

Further reading

Pseudogenes